Diplomatic relations between Germany and Switzerland are Switzerland's closest. There are over 200 agreements between Switzerland and Germany; and between Switzerland and the European Union (EU), of which Germany is a member. Switzerland is also part of the EU's Schengen Area which abolishes international borders between Schengen states.

Germany is Switzerland's most important trading partner: a third of all imports to Switzerland come from Germany (more than Switzerland's next four trading partners combined). Switzerland is also the third largest foreign investor in Germany (after other EU states and the United States) and Swiss companies also employ 260,000 people in Germany. Germany is the fifth largest investor in Switzerland and German companies employ 94,000 people in Switzerland.

The two are also each other's largest group of foreign visitors, and Switzerland is the most popular emigration destination for Germans. The German population in Switzerland is the second largest foreign group (after Italians) and the number of Swiss living in Germany has increased by 11% to 76,000. Many of these emigrants are highly qualified professionals such as university teachers.

The two share a border and a language (German is one of Switzerland's four official languages). More than 44,000 Germans commute across the border every day and there is strong cross border cooperation, particularly on the Upper Rhine and Lake Constance. However relations are strained by unresolved tax issues and German restrictions on flights into Zurich.

Diplomatic missions 
 Germany has an embassy in Bern.
 Switzerland has an embassy in Berlin and consulates-general in Frankfurt, Munich and Stuttgart.

See also 
Foreign relations of Germany
Foreign relations of Switzerland
Büsingen am Hochrhein
Germany–Switzerland border

References

 
Switzerland
Bilateral relations of Switzerland